was a Japanese Sinologist.

Works

Aoki wrote an article named "Hu Shih and the Chinese Literary Revolution" which was published in Chinese Study (T: 支那學, S: 支那学, P: Zhīnà Xué) in 1920. During the 1930s and 1940s, Aoki's work was considered an important contribution to translating and studying Chinese literature.

Patricia Sieber wrote that "Aoki, an internationally influential Sinologist, presented his love affair with Chinese dramas as an intimate and aesthetic affair of the heart."

When I was a child, I was already extremely enamored of [Japanese] puppet theatre (jōruri). Around 1907,... I came across Sasagawa Rinpu's History of Chinese Literature [1898]. The book quoted the "Startling Dream" scene from [Jin Shengtan's version of the] Xixiang ji (Story of the Western wing) [in which Student Zhang dreams that his beloved Cui Yingying, from whom he is temporarily separated, follows him while she is simultaneously being pursued by a bandit]. I did not yet fully comprehend what I read, but I was already thoroughly entranced. Later on, when I obtained a book that contained several annotated scenes of the Xinxiang ji, I was even happier. This was not only the beginning of my knowledge of, but also of my love for Chinese drama.

Some of his books include:

 (1959) Yuan Jen Tsa Chu Hsu Shuo
 (1930) Shina kinsei gikyoku shi
 (1957) Yuan ren za ju gai shuo
 (1943) Shina bungaku shisō shi (支那文学思想史; "A History of Chinese Literary Thought"), Iwanami Shoten

The Shina bungei shichō (支那文芸論藪) by Aoki was published in the Iwanami Koza series Sekai shichō in 1928. Wang Chün-yüh (C: 王俊瑜, P: Wáng Jùnyú) published a Chinese version in 1933, titled Chung-kuo ku-tai wen-i ssu-ch'ao lun (T: 中國古代文藝思潮論, S:中国古代文艺思潮论, P: Zhōngguó Gǔdài Wényì Sīcháo Lún).

References
Hightower, James R. "A History of Chinese Literary Thought by Aoki Masaru." (book review). The Far Eastern Quarterly, Vol. 10, No. 3 (May, 1951), pp. 313–320. Available at JSTOR.

Notes

Further reading
 LI Yong (李勇). "Aoki Masaru's Studies on the Nature Worship of Art Life of Chinese Scholars" (青木正儿论中华文人艺术生活的自然崇拜). Journal of Weinan Normal University (渭南师范学院学报：综合版), 2012, Issue 05, pp. 89–93.

1887 births
1964 deaths
Japanese sinologists
Japanese writers
Kyoto University alumni
Scholars of Chinese opera